Cyclostome is a biological term (from the Greek for "round mouth") used in a few different senses:
 for the taxon Cyclostomi, which comprises the extant jawless fishes: the hagfish (Myxini) and the lampreys (Petromyzontidae). This was thought for a time to be a paraphyletic group and this usage of the term was deprecated by some. However, there is strong molecular evidence for cyclostome monophyly, and thus the term remains in use.
 for the Order Cyclostomatida of bryozoans, tiny animals that live in colonies and form large calcitic skeletons.
 for one of two subgroups of braconid wasps.

References